The 2001 Black Reel Awards, which annually recognize and celebrate the achievements of black people in feature, independent and television films, took place in Washington, D.C. on February 12, 2001. Love & Basketball swept the awards, picking up six trophies during the evening. The Corner followed very closely behind with five awards.

Winners and nominees
Winners are listed first and highlighted in bold.

References

2001 in American cinema
2001 awards in the United States
Black Reel Awards
2000 film awards